Llantilio may refer to either of two villages in Monmouthshire, south east Wales:
Llantilio Crossenny
Llantilio Pertholey